The National Conference of Democratic Mayors is the representative body of city mayors in the United States affiliated to the Democratic Party, in the same way that the Democratic Governors Association represents state governors within the party. Founded in the 1970s, the National Conference of Democratic Mayors serves as a forum for Democratic mayors to discuss their goals and objectives with other mayors, party organizations, the Democratic National Committee, and private business partners. The organization provides resources for mayors such as talking points, newsletters, and fact sheets.

It participates in the U.S. Conference of Mayors and the National League of Cities.

Its executive committee is:
 President – Eric Garcetti (Los Angeles, California)
 Vice president – Nan Whaley (Dayton, Ohio)
 Vice president – Kate Gallego (Phoenix, Arizona)
 Vice president – Michael Hancock (Denver, Colorado)
 Vice president – Steve Adler (Austin, Texas)
 Secretary – Muriel Bowser (Washington, D.C.)
 Treasurer – Levar Stoney (Richmond, Virginia)

External links
 Homepage

Democratic Party (United States) organizations
Factions in the Democratic Party (United States)